Saturday Night Live has long mocked the television medium with many fake commercials and parodies of TV shows themselves. Another of the show's frequently used styles of recurring sketches has been the talk show format (e.g. "The Brian Fellowes Show", "Barry Gibb Talk Show", etc.). However, anything from cop shows to children's shows has been fair game for the ever-changing cast.

Sketches with TV show themes are listed here chronologically by order of first appearance.
 The Land of Gorch (Jim Henson) - October 11, 1975 – September 18, 1976 
 The Mr. Bill Show – February 28, 1976
 Consumer Probe (Dan Aykroyd, Jane Curtin, Candice Bergen) – December 11, 1976
 E. Buzz Miller and Christie Christina (Dan Aykroyd, Laraine Newman) – January 22, 1977
 Leonard Pinth-Garnell (Dan Aykroyd) – March 12, 1977
 The Ex-Police (Dan Aykroyd, Bill Murray) – October 15, 1977
 Woman to Woman (Gilda Radner) – October 21, 1978
 Telepsychic (Dan Aykroyd) – December 9, 1978
 The Bel-Airabs (Don Novello, Bill Murray, Jane Curtin, Gilda Radner, Laraine Newman) – December 8, 1979
 What's It All About (Gilbert Gottfried, Denny Dillon) – November 15, 1980
 Mister Robinson's Neighborhood (Eddie Murphy) – February 21, 1981
 Fernando's Hideaway (Billy Crystal) – November 3, 1984
 The Limits of the Imagination (Randy Quaid) – November 9, 1985
 The Pat Stevens Show (Nora Dunn) – November 16, 1985
 The Church Lady (Dana Carvey) – October 11, 1986
 Instant Coffee with Bill Smith (Kevin Nealon) – October 18, 1986
 Miss Connie's Fable Nook (Jan Hooks, Dana Carvey, Dennis Miller, Kevin Nealon) – November 8, 1986
 Pumping Up with Hans & Franz (Dana Carvey, Kevin Nealon) – October 17, 1987
 Learning To Feel (Nora Dunn) – January 23, 1988
 Wayne's World (Dana Carvey, Mike Myers) – February 18, 1989
 Cooking with the Anal Retentive Chef (Phil Hartman) – April 1, 1989
 Tales Of Ribaldry (Jon Lovitz) – April 1, 1989
 Sprockets (Mike Myers) – April 15, 1989
 Lank Thompson (Mike Myers) – October 21, 1989
 The Dark Side with Nat X (Chris Rock, Chris Farley) – November 10, 1990
 Simon (Mike Myers) – November 10, 1990
 Daily Affirmation with Stuart Smalley (Al Franken) – February 9, 1991
 Coffee Talk with Linda Richman (Mike Myers) – October 12, 1991
 Theatre Stories (Mike Myers, Julia Sweeney, Dana Carvey) – December 14, 1991
 Sassy's Sassiest Boys (Phil Hartman) – February 6, 1993
 The Denise Show (Adam Sandler) – October 2, 1993
 Good Morning Brooklyn (Jay Mohr) – November 12, 1994
 Perspectives with Lionel Osbourne (Tim Meadows) – January 21, 1995
 Scottish Soccer Hooligan Weekly (Mike Myers, Mark McKinney) – January 21, 1995
 The Joe Pesci Show (Jim Breuer) – December 2, 1995
 The Quiet Storm (Tim Meadows) – October 19, 1996
 Shopping At Home Network (Will Ferrell, Chris Kattan) – November 16, 1996
 Delicious Dish (Ana Gasteyer, Molly Shannon, Rachel Dratch, Alec Baldwin) – November 16, 1996
 Celebrity Jeopardy! (Will Ferrell, Darrell Hammond, Norm Macdonald, and various others) – December 7, 1996
 Goth Talk (Molly Shannon, Chris Kattan, Jim Breuer) – April 12, 1997
 Leon Phelps, The Ladies Man (Tim Meadows) – October 4, 1997
 Issues with Jeffrey Kaufman (Jim Breuer) – October 18, 1997
 Morning Latte (Cheri Oteri, Will Ferrell) – October 25, 1997
 Pretty Living (Molly Shannon, Ana Gasteyer) – March 14, 1998
 Hello Dolly (Ana Gasteyer) – October 3, 1998
 The How Do You Say? Ah, Yes, Show (Chris Kattan, Jimmy Fallon) – October 17, 1998
 Dog Show (Will Ferrell, Molly Shannon) – December 5, 1998
 Pimp Chat (Tracy Morgan, Tim Meadows) – December 5, 1998
 Jarret's Room (Jimmy Fallon, Horatio Sanz) – December 16, 2000
 Wake Up Wakefield! (Maya Rudolph, Rachel Dratch, Jimmy Fallon, Horatio Sanz) – March 17, 2001
 America Undercover (Chris Kattan, Amy Poehler) – November 3, 2001
 The Ferey Muhtar Talk Show (Horatio Sanz) – March 16, 2002
 Top O' the Morning (Seth Meyers, Jimmy Fallon) – October 19, 2002
 Pranksters (Seth Meyers) – February 22, 2003
 Spy Glass (Amy Poehler, Seth Meyers) – November 1, 2003
 Appalachian Emergency Room (Seth Meyers, Chris Parnell, and various others) – January 10, 2004
 The Prince Show (Fred Armisen, Maya Rudolph) – February 14, 2004
 ¡Show Biz Grande Explosion! (Fred Armisen as Fericito (see 2002–2003), Horatio Sanz) – March 6, 2004
 Vincent Price's Holiday Special (Bill Hader) – November 19, 2005
 Deep House Dish (Kenan Thompson, Rachel Dratch, Andy Samberg) – November 19, 2005
 The Dakota Fanning Show (Amy Poehler) – February 3, 2007
 Dateline (Bill Hader) – November 22, 2008

See also
 List of recurring Saturday Night Live characters and sketches
 List of Saturday Night Live musical sketches
 List of Saturday Night Live commercial parodies
 Saturday Night Live characters appearing on Weekend Update

Lists of recurring Saturday Night Live characters and sketches